Mulinu'u is a small village situated on a tiny peninsula on Upolu island in Samoa. It became the site of the colonial administration in Samoa in the 1870s and continues to be the site for the Parliament of Samoa. It is located on the central north coast of the island and is part of the urban area comprising Apia, the country's capital.

Overview
Mulinu'u peninsula, where this and some other villages are situated, is the site of the Fale Fono or Parliament House in Samoa as well as the Lands and Titles Court.  At the tip of the peninsula is the meteorology office which was initially established in the late 19th century as an observatory.  The peninsula is also the site for several important tombs including that of the previous Head of State, Malietoa Tanumafili II.

The population of Mulinu'u village is 27. It is part of Tuamasaga district.

References

Populated places in Tuamasaga
Apia